Tatsuji (written: 達治, 達次 or 辰次) is a masculine Japanese given name. Notable people with the name include:

 (1900–1964), Japanese poet, writer, critic and editor
 (born 1922), Japanese scientist
 (1885–1945), Japanese military officer

Japanese masculine given names